Tuihaleni Frank Kayele (born February 12, 1964) is a former long-distance runner from Namibia, who competed for his native African country at the 1992 Summer Olympics in Barcelona, Spain. There he finished in 69th place (2:31.41) on the Men's Marathon.

Achievements
All results regarding marathon, unless stated otherwise

References

1964 births
Living people
Namibian male marathon runners
Namibian male long-distance runners
Olympic athletes of Namibia
Athletes (track and field) at the 1992 Summer Olympics